Rayyithunge Muthagaddim Party (sometimes also translated as the Peoples' Progress Party) was the first political party of the Maldives.

Rayyitunge Muthagaddim Party (RMP)

 Party established:  19 October 1950
 Membership as of 1 January 1953: 1871 women and 2870 men

Party President: 
 Mohamed Amin Didi

Chief Vice President: 
 Ibrahim Muhammad Didi

Second Vice President: 
 Mr. Ahmed Hilmy Didi

Honorary Vice Presidents: 
Annabeela Aminath Hussain 
Annabeela Zubeida Mohamed Didi (the Party President's junior wife)
Mr Ahmed Kamil Didi 
Sheikh Malin Moosa Maafahaiy Kaleyfan 
Mr Adam Naseer Maniku 
                            
Party Secretaries: 
 Annabeel Hassan Ali Didi 
 Mr Ibrahim Shihab

Treasurer: 
 Mr Kudadhaharaagey Ibrahim Didi

Publicity Secretary: 
 Mr N.T. Hassan Didi

 Consultative Committee: 
 Annabeela Fathmath Ibrahim Didi 
 Annabeela Fathmath Saeed (Party President's senior wife) 
 Miss Aminath Faiza 
 Annabeel Abdul Wahhab 
 Mr Adam Naseer Maniku 
 Mr Ahmed Hilmy Didi 
 Mr Bandhu Mohamed Kaleyfan 
 Mr Bucha Hassan Kaleyfan 
 Mr Kerafa Mohamed Kaleyfan
 Mr Kateeb Don Kaleyfan 
 Mr Maarandu Mudin Kaleyfan 
 Mr Feeali Kateeb Kaleyfan 
 Mr Havaru-Thinadu Abdulla Kateeb Manikfan
 Mr Bilal Tuttu Maniku
 Mr Maizan Mohamed Maniku
 Mr Tutteedi Don Maniku

References

Political parties in the Maldives
Maldivian nationalism